Marco Ramos may refer to:
 Marco Ramos (basketball) (born 1987), Mexican professional basketball player
 Marco Ramos (footballer) (born 1983), Portuguese professional football player